Arboretum Park is a small arboretum located at 312 E. State Street, Eagle, Idaho, United States. It contains 37 types of trees, as well as roses, perennials, native plants, and ground covers. All are identified by name stakes identifying the scientific and common names.

See also

List of parks in Boise
List of botanical gardens in the United States

External links
Arboretum Park

Arboreta in Idaho
Botanical gardens in Idaho
Protected areas of Ada County, Idaho
Tourist attractions in Boise, Idaho